The 2016 Florida Cup was a friendly association football tournament played in the United States. It was the second edition of the competition, which included teams from Brazil, Colombia, Ukraine, Germany and the United States. Atlético Mineiro were crowned champions for the first time.

Teams

Venues

Matches

Table

Broadcasting rights
The tournament will be broadcast in 144 countries.

References

External links 

 

Florida Cup (soccer)
Florida Cup 2016
Florida Cup